ŁKS Łódź is a Polish women's basketball team based in Łódź. With nine Polish Championship titles, it is one of the most accomplished Polish women's basketball teams. It serves as a section of the ŁKS Łódź multi-sport club.

Honours
 Polish Championship
 Winners (9 times): 1967, 1972, 1973, 1974, 1982, 1983, 1986, 1995, 1997
 Runners-up (10 times): 1930, 1931, 1966, 1968, 1971, 1975, 1977, 1991, 1996, 1998
 Third place (11 times): 1964, 1969, 1976, 1978, 1979, 1980, 1981, 1985, 1987, 1994, 2003

References

Women's basketball teams in Poland
Sport in Łódź
Basketball teams established in 1929
1929 establishments in Poland